The Miss Michigan Teen USA competition is the pageant that selects the representative for the state of Michigan in the Miss Teen USA pageant and the name of the title held by that winner. This pageant is produced by Proctor Productions, including Melissa Pitchford who was Miss Ohio USA 1990.

In terms of number of placements, Michigan has a moderated success at Miss Teen USA, having only placed ten times. The state's highest placement was in 2005, when Catherine Laurion was 1st runner-up to Allie LaForce of Ohio. Courtney Pizzimenti placed 2nd runner-up at Miss Teen USA 2012.

Isabella Mosqueda of Cedar Springs is the most recent winner.

Results summary

Placements
 1st runners-up: Catherine Laurion (2005)
 2nd runners-up: Alicia Jaros (2003), Courtney Pizzimenti (2012)
 3rd runners-up: Isabella Mosqueda (2022)
 Top 5: Sara Dusendang (1999)
 Top 10: Tamika Thomas (1996)
 Top 15: Raquel McClendon (2006), Kristen Danyal (2009), Iris Robare (2014), Anane Loveday (2018)
Michigan holds a record of 10 placements at Miss Teen USA.

Winners 

1 Age at the time of the Miss Teen USA pageant

References

External links

Michigan
Women in Michigan